143rd meridian may refer to:

143rd  meridian east, a line of longitude east of the Greenwich Meridian
143rd meridian west, a line of longitude west of the Greenwich Meridian